Red Poppies is a 1998 Chinese-language novel by the Tibetan Chinese writer Alai, whose theme is based on the Tibetan custom and traditions. The novel consists of 12 chapters with a total of 481,000 Chinese characters. It won the Mao Dun Literature Prize in 2000.

Summary 
Set in Ngawa, Sichuan, the novel chronicles the stories of a Tibetan Tusi and his family from the 1920s to 1949, which gives a general introduction to the economic development in Ngawa, the territorial disputes among Tibetan chieftains, and the fights for throne succession.

Main characters

Family of Tusi Maiqi
 The first-person narrator: considered as an 'idiot', the second son of Tusi Maiqi, mother is a Han Chinese
 Tusi Maiqi: father of the first-person narrator
 Mother: the second wife of Tusi Maiqi, a Han Chinese woman as a gift given to Maiqi by a merchant trading furs and herbs
 Brother: the eldest son of Tusi Maiqi, son of Maiqi's first wife, considered as the successor of Tusi Maiqi
 Sangji Zhuoma: maid of the first-person narrator
 The lame butler
 Weng Bo Yi Xi: Lama of Gelug
 Suo Lang Ze Lang: attendant of the first-person narrator
 Yang Zong: used to be the woman of the chieftain Zhazha, belongs to Tusi Maiqi after Zhazha's death
 Lama Menba
 Sister: half-blooded, shares the same father with the narrator, lives in London
 Uncle: Tusi Maiqi's younger brother, trades in India
 The silversmith: later marries Sangji Zhuoma

Other characters
 Special commissioner Huang: an official of the national government
 Tusi Ronggong: a female Tusi
 Tana: the beautiful daughter of Tusi Ronggong
 Tusi Laxueba
 Tusi Wangbo

Reception 
Comments by the selection committee of the Mao Dun Literature Prize: "The novel narrates from a unique viewpoint, with a rich connotation of Tibetan culture. A slight of fantasy enhances the artistic expression. The writing style is light, charming and poetic".

Adaptations 
TV series: a television adaptation of Red Poppies was first shown in 2003.
Dance drama: Red Poppies was adapted into a dance drama by Hong Kong Dance Company in 2006.

References

External links 
 在线阅读 (Online Reading)
 Douban

Mao Dun Literature Prize
1998 Chinese novels
Novels set in Tibet
Sichuan in fiction